Up (2002) is the seventh studio and 13th album overall released by the English rock musician Peter Gabriel. It is his most recent full-length studio album of new original material to date, as the subsequent albums Scratch My Back and New Blood feature covers of other artists' songs, and orchestral renderings of Gabriel's older material, respectively.

Background
Gabriel started work on the album in the spring of 1995. He and engineer Richard Chappell travelled between different locations during the initial writing stages of the album using a portable setup (recording at Real World Studios in between): the first two months were spent in a rented chalet in Méribel, then three months in Senegal starting in October 1995, followed by another trip to Méribel in Spring 1996 and a brief recording stint on a friend's recording-studio-equipped boat along the Amazon in Summer 1997. From then on, the rest of the album work was based at Real World Studios, where further writing, recording, overdubbing, editing and mixing took place over the next four to five years. At one point, work was being done simultaneously on both Up and the OVO soundtrack for a few months, separately by engineers Chappell and Richard Evans (respectively). However, in November 1998, both engineers decided to focus on completing the OVO soundtrack, so work on Up was temporarily put on hold.

By late 2000, work on the album was finally gathering renewed pace, with a string section recorded at AIR Lyndhurst Studios in London amongst other things. Renowned mixer Tchad Blake was invited to Real World Studios in early 2001 to begin the final mixing stage. He would work on the mixes in the Big Room in Real World Studios, while Gabriel and Chappell continued recording in the Writing Room. Between them they'd figure out which of the newly recorded parts would be used in the mix or not.

Its name was Up from the start, though at one point the name I/O was considered. In 1998, Peter learned that R.E.M. also intended to release an album bearing the same title, but decided to keep it after consulting with the band and much consideration: "I have been living in an 'Up' world for four years now and have no wish to come down." In the months preceding the album's release, video clips of Gabriel talking about the songs as well as short demos of each song were released at the coming of every full moon on Gabriel's official website.

Songs
The album's lyrics deal mostly with birth and especially death. The opening track, "Darkness", is a song about overcoming fears. "Growing Up" is a summation of life put to a pulsating beat. "Sky Blue" is a track Gabriel claimed to have been working on for 10 years before finishing it. The track "No Way Out" is the first track to deal with death solely, though death is a common theme across the entire album. "I Grieve" was conceived after Gabriel looked over his catalogue of music as if it were a catalogue of emotional tools. He found one major missing tool to be one to cope with death and therefore "I Grieve" was born. Gabriel performed the song live on the television show Larry King Weekend on the first anniversary of September 11 attacks in the US, during which Gabriel said that his two daughters were living in New York City and he could not contact them for some time, and that this song was for people who did not hear anything from their relatives then. It was not, however, written specifically for 9/11, having appeared in an earlier version on the City of Angels soundtrack in 1998.

The first single from Up, "The Barry Williams Show" is a down-beat, jazzy song dealing with reality talk shows such as Jerry Springer (in fact, The Brady Bunch star Barry Williams appeared as an audience member in the Sean Penn-directed music video for the song with Requiem for a Dream actor Christopher McDonald playing the titular talk show host).

The song "Signal to Noise" features guest vocalist Nusrat Fateh Ali Khan, who worked on the song in the studio before his death in 1997. Originally he performed the song in a "much starker" form, before Gabriel transformed it into a strings-oriented piece as the cornerstone of the album. Finally, "The Drop" consists of only Gabriel and a Bösendorfer grand piano.

Formats and packaging
The album cover pictures five water drops in a diagonal line, over a blurred background of Gabriel's face. Each drop contains a refracted image of Gabriel's face.

The album is available in stereo on CD & vinyl while Surround Sound versions are encoded in Super Audio CD, and DTS DVD-A.

The album, in a similar fashion to the earlier Us, used specially commissioned artwork representing each song, which was reproduced in the CD, vinyl, DVD-A, and SACD packaging. In this case the medium chosen was photography. Pictures are by Arno Rafael Minkkinen for "Darkness", M. Richard Kirstel for "Growing Up", Shomei Tomatsu for "Sky Blue" and "I Grieve", Mari Mahr for "No Way Out", Paul Thorel for "The Barry Williams Show", Granular-Synthesis (Kurt Hentschläger and Ulf Langheinrich) for "My Head Sounds Like That", Susan Derges for "More Than This", Michal Rovner for "Signal to Noise", Adam Fuss for "The Drop."

Protected CD copies, released in US only, include "Burn You Up, Burn You Down" (this song was later released on a second disc of compilation album Hit in 2003 and on Big Blue Ball album in 2008). Also, on these copies "No Way Out" has a different name – "Don't Leave".

Critical reception

Track listing

Personnel

Musicians

 Peter Gabriel – vocals (all tracks) organ (2, 6, 8) bass guitar (4), harmonica (6), piano (1, 3–4, 7–8, 10), reversed strings (6), harmonium (4), keyboards (1, 3, 5), tom–tom (4), samples (5, 9), Mellotron (6–7, 9), electronics (1, 3, 6, 8–9), bass keys (2, 5–6, 9), MPC groove (1–4, 6, 8–9), crotales (4), sampled guitar (8) sampled keyboards (2, 4) string samples (6), Telecaster (4, 6), JamMan (1–2)
 Tony Levin – bass (1, 3–8)
 David Rhodes – guitars (1–4, 7, 9), guitar (6, 8), electric guitar (5), backing vocals (2–3, 6, 8–9)
 Manu Katché – drums (1–3, 5–7)
 Dave Power – drums (1)
 Hossam Ramzy – tabla (4), percussion (7)
 L. Shankar – improvised double violin (5)
 Melanie Gabriel – backing vocals (3, 8)
 Tchad Blake – tape scratches (2), groove treatment effects (6)
 Jon Brion – mandolin (8), Chamberlin (8)
 Richard Chappell – programming, percussion (2), treated loop (6), loop manipulation (7)
 Christian Le Chevretel – trumpet (6)
 Adrian Chivers – backing vocals (2)
 Pete Davis – additional programming (2)
 Dominque Mahut – percussion (2, 7)
 Richard Evans – recorder (4), acoustic guitar (5)
 Bob Ezrin – co–brass arrangement (7)
 Tony Berg – backwards guitar (6)
 Mitchell Froom – backwards piano (4)
 Steve Gadd – drums (4, 9), percussion (9)
 Peter Green – guitar (3)
 Dominic Greensmith – drums (4, 8)
 Will Gregory – string arrangements (1, 9)
 Stephen Hague – percussion (5)
 Chris Hughes – drum programming (4)
 Nick Ingham – orchestrations (1, 9)
 Nusrat Fateh Ali Khan – vocals (9)
 Daniel Lanois – guitar (3), percussion (3)
 Sally Larkin – backing vocals (6)
 Ged Lynch – drums (2, 6, 8), percussion (2–9)
 Chuck Norman – Spectre programming (5), bridge strings (5)
 David Sancious – Hammond organ (3)
 Ed Shearmur – co–brass arrangement (7)
 Alex Swift – additional programming (1–3)
 Assane Thiam – percussion (7)
 Danny Thompson – double bass (4)
 Will White – percussion (5)
 Black Dyke Band – brass (7)
 Blind Boys of Alabama – additional vocals (3), backing vocals (8)
 Dhol Foundation – Dhol drums (9)
 London Session Orchestra – strings (1, 9)
 Isobel Griffiths – string contractor (1, 9)

Technical personnel

 Peter Gabriel – production, design concept
 Steve Osbourne – additional production (2)
 Stephen Hauge – co–production (5)
 Richard Chappell – recording, engineering 
 Richard Evans – additional engineering
 Alan Coleman – assistant engineering
 Edel Griffith – assistant engineering
 Dan Roe – assistant engineering
 Chris Treble – assistant engineering
 Ben Findlay – on–band recording session engineering 
 Steve Orchard – orchestra engineering (1, 9)
 Derek Zuzarte – additional engineering (Blind Boys of Alabama vocals)
 Kevin Quah – additional engineering (Blind Boys of Alabama vocals)
 Yang – additional engineering (Blind Boys of Alabama vocals)
 Steve McLaughlin – additional engineering (Black Dyke Band)
 Tchad Blake – mixing (1–4, 6–9) 
 Claire Lewis – mix assistant
 Marco Miglari – additional mix assistant
 Paul Grady – additional mix assistant
 Richard Evans – mixing (5)  
 Stephen Hague – mixing (5)
 Kurt Hentschläger – granular synthesis
 Ulf Langheinrich – granular synthesis
 Marc Bessant – design concept
 Susie Millns – design coordinator
 Adam Fuss – photography
 Arno Rafael Minkkien – photography
 M. Richard Kirstel – photography
 Mari Mahr – photography
 Michal Rovner – photography
 Paul Thorel – photography
 Shomei Tomatsu – photography
 Susan Derges – photography
 Susan Derges – sleeve photography
 Dilly Gent – photo coordination

Charts

Weekly charts

Year-end charts

Certifications

References

External links

 Richard Chapelle on recording Up at Sound on Sound
 

Peter Gabriel albums
2002 albums
Real World Records albums
Albums produced by Peter Gabriel
Virgin Records albums
Geffen Records albums
Art rock albums by English artists